Shayne Leanne Reese, OAM (born 15 September 1982) is an Australian medley and freestyle swimmer.

She competed in the 4×200-metre freestyle relay at the 2004 Summer Olympics, in which Australia placed fourth.

She was a member of the Australian 4×100-metre freestyle relay team since 2005, thereby participating in a quartet that won gold at the World Championships in 2005 and 2007 and the 2006 Commonwealth Games.

At the 2008 Australian Swimming Championships she qualified as a member of the 4×100-metre freestyle relay team.

See also
 List of Olympic medalists in swimming (women)
 List of World Aquatics Championships medalists in swimming (women)
 List of Commonwealth Games medallists in swimming (women)
 World record progression 4 × 100 metres freestyle relay

References

External links

1982 births
Living people
People from Victoria (Australia)
Australian female medley swimmers
Swimmers at the 2004 Summer Olympics
Swimmers at the 2008 Summer Olympics
Olympic swimmers of Australia
Olympic gold medalists for Australia
Olympic bronze medalists for Australia
Australian Institute of Sport swimmers
World record setters in swimming
Olympic bronze medalists in swimming
Australian female freestyle swimmers
World Aquatics Championships medalists in swimming
Medalists at the FINA World Swimming Championships (25 m)
Medalists at the 2008 Summer Olympics
Commonwealth Games gold medallists for Australia
Olympic gold medalists in swimming
Commonwealth Games medallists in swimming
Recipients of the Medal of the Order of Australia
Swimmers at the 2006 Commonwealth Games
21st-century Australian women
Medallists at the 2006 Commonwealth Games